Philippus de Caserta, (also Philipoctus, Filipotto, or Filipoctus) was a medieval music theorist and composer associated with the style known as ars subtilior.

Life and career
Philippus' name indicates that he came from Caserta near Naples. He is generally thought to have worked at the Papal court at Avignon in the 1370s as his ballade, Par les bons Gedeons, praises antipope Clement VII. However, it has been suggested that Philippus never left Italy, that he wrote the above ballade at Fondi near Caserta, where Clement was elected Pope, and that he worked at the francophile court of Gian Galeazzo Visconti.<ref>Reinhard Strohm, The Rise of European Music, 1380–1500", Cambridge University Press, 1993, pp.59-74</ref>

Music
Most of his surviving works are ballades, although a Credo was recently discovered, and a rondeau has been attributed to him. His ballade En attendant souffrir was written for Bernabò Visconti, confirmed by the presence of Visconti's motto in the upper voice. Two of Caserta's pieces, En remirant and De ma dolour, use fragments of text from chansons by the most famous composer of the century, Guillaume de Machaut. Caserta's own repute was significant enough for Johannes Ciconia to borrow portions of Caserta's ballades for his own virelai, Sus une fontayne.

Five theoretical treatises have been attributed to Caserta, with some in dispute among scholars.

Music
All pieces are for three voices.

Ballades
 
 
 
 
 
 

OtherCredoRondeau, Espoir dont tu m'as fayt'' (disputed)

References

Sources
  

Ars subtilior composers
Italian male classical composers
Italian music theorists
Trecento composers
Medieval male composers